Scott Newlands (born 1985) is a former Scottish professional rugby player, currently coaching the French ProD2 team Valence Romans Drome Rugby. He comes from Kelso and has previously played rugby professionally at US Carcassonne, Oyonnax Rugby, Edinburgh Rugby and at amateur level for Kelso RFC and Heriot's Rugby Club. Newlands has also played for Scotland's national rugby sevens team, as well as for Scotland A in the Churchill Cup.

References

1985 births
Living people
Commonwealth Games rugby sevens players of Scotland
Edinburgh Rugby players
Heriot's RC players
Kelso RFC players
Rugby sevens players at the 2010 Commonwealth Games
Rugby union players from Kelso
Scottish rugby union players
US Carcassonne players